Tropicoperdix is a genus of two species of birds in the pheasant family, Phasianidae. Although formerly classified in the now-defunct subfamily Perdicinae, phylogenetic evidence supports them being a sister group to the tribe Polyplectronini. They are referred to as East Asian forest partridges.

Species
 Chestnut-necklaced partridge, Tropicoperdix charltonii
 Sabah partridge, Tropicoperdix graydoni
 Green-legged partridge, Tropicoperdix chloropus

References

 

Tropicoperdix
Bird genera
Birds described in 1859
Taxa named by Edward Blyth